Hardstaff is an English surname. Notable people with the surname include:

Gerry Hardstaff (born 1940), English cricketer
Joe Hardstaff (disambiguation), multiple people
Richard Hardstaff (1863–1932), English cricketer
Veronica Hardstaff (born 1941), British politician

English-language surnames